Strabla  (Strablia) is a village in the administrative district of Gmina Wyszki, within Bielsk County, Podlaskie Voivodeship, in north-eastern Poland.

According to the 1921 census, the village was inhabited by 113 people, among whom 71 were Roman Catholic, 41 Orthodox, and 1 Mosaic. At the same time, 87 inhabitants declared Polish nationality, 26 Belarusian. There were 15 residential buildings in the village.

The village has an approximate population of 600.

References

Strabla